Nedjeljna Dalmacija was a Yugoslavian regional weekly newspaper based in Croatia.

External links
 

1971 establishments in Yugoslavia
2002 disestablishments in Croatia
Defunct newspapers published in Croatia
Newspapers established in 1971
Publications disestablished in 2002
Mass media in Zagreb
Mass media in Split, Croatia
Defunct weekly newspapers
Weekly newspapers published in Croatia